Oberlin College Press was a university press associated with Oberlin College, located in Oberlin, Ohio. The press was chiefly a publisher of poetry compilations and anthologies; it also published the literary periodical Field. The press's last release was Sharon Dolin's translation of Gemma Gorga's Book of Minutes.

Works issued by Oberlin College Press are distributed by the University of Chicago Press's Chicago Distribution Center.

See also

 List of English-language book publishing companies
 List of university presses

References

External links 
Oberlin College Press

Oberlin College Press
Ohio